Woodland Mills, also known as Cotaco  , is an unincorporated community in Morgan County, Alabama, United States.

History
The community was originally known as Cotaco, named after nearby Cotaco Creek. Cotaco Creek also loaned its name to Cotaco County, which was the original name of Morgan County. The name Cotaco is possibly derived from the Cherokee words ikati meaning "swamp" and kunahita meaning "long". A school was formerly opened in Woodland Mills.

A post office operated under the name Cotaco from 1883 to 1904 and under the name Woodland Mills from 1874 to 1909.

References

Unincorporated communities in Alabama
Unincorporated communities in Morgan County, Alabama
Populated places established in 1818